A P Singh was the Director of Central Bureau of Investigation (CBI). He was accused of abusing his position in 2017.

References

Directors of the Central Bureau of Investigation
Year of birth missing (living people)
Living people